Octant may refer to:
 Octant (plane geometry), one eighth of a full circle
 Octant (solid geometry), one of the eight divisions of 3-dimensional space by coordinate planes
 Octant (circle), a circular segment 
 Octant (instrument) for celestial navigation
 Octans, a constellation also called The Octant
 Octant (band), from Seattle, Washington